Jan Rosenthal (born 7 April 1986) is a German former professional footballer who played as an attacking midfielder.

Career

Hannover
Born in Sulingen, Lower Saxony, Rosenthal began his professional career with Hannover 96 in 2005, on a five-year deal, but had to wait until 13 August 2006 before he made his first Bundesliga appearance, as a substitute, in a 4–2 defeat to Werder Bremen. His first Bundesliga goal came against Schalke 04 in the first game he started on 21 October 2006. He settled well into the team following this, and was regular choice throughout the 2006–07 season.

SC Freiburg
After ten years with Hannover 96, Rosenthal signed a three-year contract with SC Freiburg on 11 June 2010.

Eintracht Frankfurt
On 8 March 2013, Eintracht Frankfurt announced the versatile midfielder was going to join their squad for the 2013–14 season. Rosenthal signed a three-year contract with the side. Rosenthal was loaned to 2. Bundesliga side SV Darmstadt 98 in February 2015 for the remainder of the season.

Darmstadt 98
After the loan, Frankfurt and Rosenthal agreed to terminate the contract after which Rosenthal signed for then promoted Bundesliga side Darmstadt 98 permanently for a duration of two years. In June 2017, after the club's relegation to the 2. Bundesliga, he extended his contract with the club until 2019.

In June 2018, Rosenthal announced his retirement from professional football and agreed the termination of his running contract with Darmstadt 98.

VfB Oldenburg
Rosenthal returned from his retirement in summer 2019, joining fourth-tier side VfB Oldenburg on a deal for the 2019–20 season.

International career
Rosenthal represented his country at both under-19 and under-21 levels.

Career statistics

References

External links
  
 

1986 births
Living people
People from Sulingen
German footballers
Footballers from Lower Saxony
Association football midfielders
Germany under-21 international footballers
Hannover 96 players
SC Freiburg players
Eintracht Frankfurt players
SV Darmstadt 98 players
VfB Oldenburg players
Bundesliga players
2. Bundesliga players
Regionalliga players